Ceratarcha umbrosa is a moth in the family Crambidae described by Charles Swinhoe in 1894. It is found in Asia, including China, Taiwan and India.

The wingspan is 33–37 mm.

References

Spilomelinae
Moths described in 1894
Moths of Japan